Bronson House may refer to:

in the United States
(by state)
David Morgan-Earl A. Bronson House, Phoenix, Arizona, listed on the National Register of Historic Places (NRHP) in Maricopa County, Arizona
Josiah Bronson House, Middlebury, Connecticut, listed on the NRHP in New Haven County, Connecticut
Aaron Bronson House, Southbury, Connecticut, listed on the NRHP in New Haven County, Connecticut
Bronson-Mulholland House, Palatka, Florida, listed on the NRHP in Putnam County, Florida
Dr. George Ashe Bronson House, St. Louis, MO, listed on the NHRP in St. Louis north and west of downtown
Oliver Bronson House, Hudson, NY, a U.S. National Historic Landmark, also known as Dr. Oliver Bronson House and Stables